The Polish ice hockey Ekstraklasa was the premier ice hockey league in Poland. Previously, it was known as the I Liga or Ekstraklasa from 1926–1999, and the Polska Liga Hokejowa from 1999–2013. In 2013, it was reorganized as a limited liability company and renamed the Polska Hokej Liga.

History 
The championship started in 1925-26. At first it was a non-league system composed of regional tournaments. The tournaments had two stages. The best teams qualified to the final tournament, of which the winner was declared champion. In 1938, the Polish Ice Hockey Federation decided to reorganise the championship, by creating a league system. Those plans were abandoned due to outbreak of World War II.

The current structure of the league began in 1955.

The 2019-20 season was suspended on March 11, 2020, due to health concerns with the spreading coronavirus. GKS Tychy was named league champions and will represent the league in the Champions Hockey League, Re-Plast Unia Oświęcim was named the runner ups and earned a spot in the Continental Cup, third-place was shared by JKH GKS Jastrzębie and GKS Katowice

Medalists

Titles by team

References

External links
 Hokej.Net
 The Polish Ice Hockey Federation's website
 PHL Statistics

 
Defunct ice hockey leagues in Europe
1